The 1946 United States Senate elections in Arizona took place on November 5, 1946. Incumbent Democratic U.S. Senator Ernest McFarland ran for reelection to a second term, easily defeating his Republican challenger Ward S. Powers in the general election.

Democratic primary

Candidates
 Ernest McFarland, incumbent U.S. Senator
 Harry J. Valentine, Veterans' Service Officer

Results

Republican primary

Candidates
 Ward S. Powers

General election

See also 
 United States Senate elections, 1946

References

1946
Arizona
United States Senate